Preston is an unincorporated community in Webster County, Georgia, United States, located seventeen miles west of Americus. The population was 453 at the 2000 census. From 1857 to 2009, Preston was an incorporated municipality. The community is the county seat of Webster County.

History
Preston was founded in 1856 as the seat of Webster County. It was incorporated as a town in 1857 and as a city in 1977. In 2009, the city was disincorporated and became part of the Unified Government of Webster County.

Geography
Preston is located at  (32.060789, -84.538287).

U.S. Route 280, as well as Georgia State Routes 41 and 153, are the main highways through the community. U.S. Route 280 runs from east to west as Hamilton Street, leading east  to Plains and west  to Richland. GA-41 runs from south to north through the community and is briefly concurrent with U.S. 280 through the downtown area, leading north  to Buena Vista and southwest  to Weston. GA-153 begins just north of the community and leads northeast  to Ellaville. 

Demographics

As of the census of 2000, there were 453 people, 190 households, and 129 families residing in the town. The racial makeup of the town was 67.77% White, 28.26% African American, 0.22% Native American, 3.53% from other races, and 0.22% from two or more races. Hispanic or Latino of any race were 3.75% of the population.

There were 190 households, out of which 30.0% had children under the age of 18 living with them, 50.0% were married couples living together, 15.3% had a female householder with no husband present, and 31.6% were non-families. 30.5% of all households were made up of individuals, and 19.5% had someone living alone who was 65 years of age or older.  The average household size was 2.37 and the average family size was 2.93.

In the town the population was spread out, with 24.5% under the age of 18, 7.9% from 18 to 24, 27.2% from 25 to 44, 22.3% from 45 to 64, and 18.1% who were 65 years of age or older.  The median age was 39 years. For every 100 females, there were 89.5 males.  For every 100 females age 18 and over, there were 84.9 males.

The median income for a household in the town was $29,750, and the median income for a family was $37,083. Males had a median income of $25,313 versus $19,464 for females. The per capita income for the town was $14,779.  About 19.6% of families and 24.9% of the population were below the poverty line, including 37.3% of those under age 18 and 32.9% of those age 65 or over.

Education 
The Webster County School District holds pre-school to grade twelve, and consists of one elementary-middle school and one high school. The district has 23 full-time teachers and over 405 students.
Webster County Elementary/Middle School
Webster County High School

Notable person
Walter F. George - 91st President pro tempore of the United States Senate, born on a nearby farm.

Gallery

References

External links
 Consolidated Government of Webster County Including the city of Preston, Weston, and Webster County
 Webster County Board of Education including the city of Preston and Weston
 Webster County Sheriff's Department is the primary law enforcement agency for the entire county, and is an integral part of the County's system of justice.

Unincorporated communities in Webster County, Georgia
County seats in Georgia (U.S. state)
Populated places in Webster County, Georgia
1856 establishments in Georgia (U.S. state)
Unincorporated communities in Georgia (U.S. state)
Populated places established in 1856
2009 disestablishments in Georgia (U.S. state)
Former municipalities in Georgia (U.S. state)
Populated places disestablished in 2009